John Gaffney can refer to:
John Gaffney (1855–1913), American umpire and baseball manager
John Gaffney (politician) (active 1938), Irish politician
John F. Gaffney (1934–1995), American politician
John Gaffney (actor) (active since 1994), Scottish actor